Abacetus hiekei is a species of ground beetle in the subfamily Pterostichinae. It was described by Straneo in 1975.

References

hiekei
Beetles described in 1975